The 2001–22 FA Trophy was the thirty-fourth season of the FA Trophy. A total of 177 clubs entered the competition.

The competition was won for the first time by Yeovil Town, who defeated Stevenage Borough 2–0 in the Final at Villa Park, Birmingham on 12 May 2002.

1st round

Ties

Replays

2nd round

Ties

Replays

3rd round
The teams from Football Conference entered in this round.

Ties

Replays

4th round

Ties

Replays

5th round

Ties

Replays

QuarterFinal

Semi-finals

First leg

Second leg

Stevenage Borough win 4–1 on aggregate

Yeovil Town win 5–2 on aggregate

Final

References

General
 Football Club History Database: FA Trophy 2001-02
 Rec.Sport.Soccer Statistics Foundation: FA Trophy 2001-02

Specific

2001–02 domestic association football cups
League
2001-02